The discography of Australian singer and songwriter Taylor Henderson consists of two studio albums, two extended plays, nine singles one album appearance, and five music videos. Henderson was the runner-up on the fifth season of The X Factor Australia in 2013, and subsequently received a contract with Sony Music Australia. He released his self-titled debut album in November 2013, which features selected songs he performed as part of the top twelve on The X Factor. The album debuted at number one on the ARIA Albums Chart and was certified platinum by the Australian Recording Industry Association (ARIA), denoting shipments of 70,000 copies. Additionally, the album also included Henderson's debut single "Borrow My Heart", which topped the ARIA Singles Chart and was certified double platinum.

In January 2014, Henderson collaborated with Dami Im, Jessica Mauboy, Justice Crew, Nathaniel Willemse and Samantha Jade on a cover of "I Am Australian" to coincide with the Australia Day celebrations. Their cover peaked at number 51 on the ARIA Singles Chart. Henderson released his second studio album Burnt Letters in July 2014, which became his second consecutive number-one album on the ARIA Albums Chart. It was certified gold, denoting shipments of 35,000 copies. The album was preceded by the lead single "When You Were Mine", which peaked at number five on ARIA Singles Chart and was certified platinum. Its second single "Already Gone" was released to moderate success, peaking at number 42 on the ARIA Singles Chart.

Studio albums

Extended plays

Singles

Other charted songs

Album appearances

Music videos

References

External links
 
 [ Taylor Henderson] at AllMusic

Discographies of Australian artists
Pop music discographies
Folk music discographies